CIMIC Group Limited (formerly Leighton Holdings) is an Australian construction contractor. It is active in the telecommunications, engineering and infrastructure, building and property, mining and resources, and environmental services industries. It has operations in Australia, Southeast Asia, New Zealand and the Middle East. Formerly listed on the Australian Securities Exchange, it is a subsidiary of Hochtief.

CIMIC stands for Construction, Infrastructure, Mining and Concessions.

History

Founded in 1949 by Stanley Leighton, Leighton Holdings was first listed on the Melbourne Stock Exchange in 1962. The company formed Leighton Asia, based in Hong Kong, in 1975.

In July 1983 Leighton Holdings, purchased Thiess Contractors, with its major shareholder, Hochtief, becoming a shareholder in Leighton Holdings. In April 1997 the Welded Mesh structural materials division was sold to Smorgon Steel. 

In 2000, Leighton Holdings bought a 70% stake in John Holland; this was increased to 99% in 2004 and 100% in December 2007. Hochtief became a majority shareholder of Leighton Holdings in February 2001.

In October 2013 Fairfax Media alleged that Leighton Holdings had made corrupt payments to Hussain al-Shahristani, Deputy Prime Minister of Iraq, to secure an oil pipeline contract in Iraq and other contracts. Basil Al Jarah, the Iraq country manager for Unaoil, a Monaco-based company allegedly acting for Leighton Holdings, subsequently pleaded guilty to corruption.

By March 2014, Spanish company ACS Group, through its acquisition of a majority shareholding in Hochtief, was the majority owner of Leighton Holdings. In June 2014, Verdes also became chairman of Leighton's executive board.

In December 2014, Leighton Holdings sold John Holland to China Communications Construction for $1.15 billion.

In April 2015, in the wake of the earlier corruption allegations against Leighton Holdings, ACS changed Leighton’s name to CIMIC Group (abbreviated from Construction, Infrastructure, Mining and Concessions).

In March 2016, CIMIC purchased mining company Sedgman for A$256 million. In December 2016, CIMIC purchased engineering company UGL Limited for A$524 million.

In November 2021, the Ventia services division was spun off with CIMIC retaining a 33% shareholding.

In March 2022, CIMIC was accused of arranging its affairs through the sale of its Middle Eastern business interests to avoid paying workers, subcontractors and suppliers in the region. Fatima Almass Al-Hamad, a judicial guard in Qatar, who was appointed by the court as an administrator of the Qatar business, Leighton Contractors Qatar, described the situation as "a humanitarian disaster". In April 2022, Hochtief increased its shareholding and commenced action to compulsorily acquire the remaining shares. In May 2022, CIMIC was delisted from the Australian Securities Exchange.

Structure
CIMIC Group includes the following businesses:
CPB Contractors (construction)
Leighton Asia (construction)
Broad (construction)
Thiess (mining)
Sedgman (mining)
UGL Limited (services)
UGL Rail
Pacific Partnerships (public private partnerships)
EIC Activities (consultancy)

Major projects

Major projects undertaken by Leighton Contractors (renamed CPB Contractors in January 2016) include:
Yarra Glen Road, Canberra, completed in 1967
Ross River Dam, Queensland, completed in 1971
Australian Astronomical Observatory, Sydney, completed in 1971
Tallowa Dam, New South Wales, completed in 1976
Canberra Stadium, completed in 1977
Bowen Bridge, Tasmania, completed in 1984
Burdekin Dam, Queensland, completed in 1987
Brisbane Airport, completed in 1988
Sydney Convention & Exhibition Centre, completed in 1988
Newman to Port Hedland section of the Great Northern Highway, completed in 1990
ABC Centre, Ultimo, completed in 1991
Brisbane Convention & Exhibition Centre, completed in 1995
Star City Casino, Sydney, completed in 1997
North Lantau Highway, Hong Kong, completed in 1997
Olympic Park railway station, Sydney, completed in 1998
Eastern Distributor, Sydney, completed in 1999
Second Narrows Road Bridge, Perth, completed in 2001
Westlink M7, Sydney, completed in 2005
Cross City Tunnel, Sydney, completed in 2005
Westpac Place, Sydney, completed in 2006
Mandurah railway line, Western Australia, completed in 2007
North-West T-way, Sydney, completed in 2007
Eagle's Nest Tunnel and Sha Tin Heights Tunnel, Hong Kong, completed in 2008
Buranda to Coorparoo sections of the Eastern Busway, Queensland, completed in 2009
Forrest Highway, Western Australia, competed in 2009
Clem Jones Tunnel, Brisbane, completed in 2010
Gateway Bridge Duplication, Brisbane, completed in 2011
ABC Brisbane Centre, completed in 2012
Deer Park West to West Werribee Junction, Regional Rail Link, Melbourne, completed in 2015
South Island line, Hong Kong, completed in 2016
Redevelopment of the Royal Adelaide Hospital, completed in 2017
Northern Beaches Hospital, Sydney, completed in 2018
M4 East, Sydney, completed in 2019
Canberra Metro, completed in 2019
Sydney Metro Northwest, Sydney, completed in 2019
West Gate Tunnel, Melbourne, due to be completed in 2022
Sydney Metro City & Southwest, Sydney, due to be completed in 2021
Sunbury railway line upgrade, Melbourne, due to be completed in 2023
Parramatta Light Rail, Sydney, due to be completed in 2023

References

External links
CIMIC official website

Australian companies established in 1949
Companies based in Sydney
Companies formerly listed on the Australian Securities Exchange
Construction and civil engineering companies of Australia
Construction and civil engineering companies established in 1949
Holding companies of Australia
Holding companies established in 1949
Mining services companies of Australia
1960s initial public offerings